Summer Session is a dating simulation video game for the Microsoft Windows, Mac OS X and Linux platforms. The game was developed and published by Hanako Games and Italian studio Tycoon Games. It uses anime-style graphics and is written in English. It was released on July 2, 2008.

Gameplay
Players must balance their schedules in order to raise their character's statistics and pass school examinations. During play they encounter non-player characters and befriend them, aiming to find romance. Restarting the game after completion enables players to unlock additional endings.

Reception 
Reviewers at Game Tunnel gave the game an average review score of 7.25/10, with the lowest review deriding it as "pervy" while the highest called the graphics "spectacular" and the writing "excellent", saying it "appealed to my inner otaku fanboy".

Emily Short of GameSetWatch said that the game "hit the narrative sweet spot".

Greg Costikyan of PlayThisThing called the game "nicely polished for what it is" and said that it had replay value.

References

External links
 Summer Session at Hanako Games
 Summer Session at Tycoon Games
 

2008 video games
Dating sims
Linux games
MacOS games
Windows games
Visual novels
Ren'Py games
Video games developed in Italy